James Vernon Buchanan is a Republican member of the Florida Legislature representing the state's 74th House district, which includes part of Sarasota County.

History
In his first run for elected office, Buchanan was defeated by Democrat Margaret Good in a nationally publicized February 2018 special election to fill the 72nd district seat in the Florida House. Buchanan had previously been a candidate in the 71st district, but withdrew his candidacy.

Buchanan is the son of U.S. Rep. Vern Buchanan.

Florida House of Representatives
Buchanan defeated Linda Yates in the August 28, 2018 Republican primary, winning 59.2% of the vote. In the November 6, 2018 general election, Buchanan won 56.91% of the vote, defeating Democrat Tony Mowry and a third candidate. This is the third State House district Buchanan has run for, and his first successful candidacy.

Committee assignments 

 Agriculture, Conservation & Resiliency Subcommittee   Chair
 Ways & Means Committee   Vice Chair
 Infrastructure Strategies Committee
 State Affairs Committee
 Agriculture & Natural Resources Appropriations Subcommittee

References

Republican Party members of the Florida House of Representatives
Living people
21st-century American politicians
Florida State University alumni
University of South Florida alumni
People from Farmington Hills, Michigan
1982 births